SN 2213-1745 was an extremely remote superluminous supernova (SLSN), which occurred in between November 2004 and June 2005. Its peak far-ultraviolet absolute magnitude reached −21.2, which was comparable to the total absolute magnitude of its host galaxy. The distance (redshift) to this supernova  makes it one of the most remote supernova observed as of 2012. The luminosity of SN 2213-1745 evolved slowly over several years as it was still detectable in November 2006. Both the high luminosity and slow decay indicate that the supernova's progenitor was a star with an initial mass as high as 250 solar masses. The supernova explosion itself was likely  a pair-instability supernova similar to the SN 2007bi event, with which it shares many similarities.

References

External links
 Light curves and spectra on the Open Supernova Catalog
 12 Billion-Year Old Supernova Discovered by Astronomers
 Elemental origins glimpsed in 12 billion year old supernova

Supernovae
Astronomical objects discovered in 2005
Aquarius (constellation)